Victoria Park Racing & Recreation Grounds Co Ltd v Taylor, commonly referred as the Victoria Park Racing case, is a leading case of the High Court of Australia on determining whether property rights exist, and protecting claims in property for the purposes of tort law. It is also notable in its rejection of the concepts of quasi-property and privacy in the framework of the common law. It has been observed that the concept of property itself cannot be entirely satisfactorily explained without accounting, in some way or other, for the ruling in this case.

In the 1930s, radio broadcasting in Australia challenged the monopolies of racing clubs, who exercised tight control over access to the racecourse, supported by existing laws, with minimal media reporting in the form of scores scratched on boards at the racecourse and more detailed newspaper summaries after the event.

Background
The plaintiff owned Victoria Park, a racing track in south Sydney, which charged admissions to people who placed bets on the races. The racecourse was surrounded by a very high fence. Taylor, who had a house and front yard adjacent to the course, allowed the radio broadcasting station 2UW to construct a five-metre high platform on scaffolding from which someone could see into the course and broadcast – with the help of binoculars – the races and information about horses posted at the ground, which facilitated unregulated off-track betting. Attendance at the ground plummeted.

The Plaintiff claimed that on-track betting was lower as a result of the broadcasts, as people who had previously come to the track were now listening on the radio instead and Taylor was profiting at the expense of the plaintiff.

He applied to the Supreme Court of New South Wales for an injunction against Taylor on the footing of nuisance and breach of copyright. Privacy and non-natural use of property were also cited as grounds. It was common ground that the mere construction and use of the raised platform constituted no breach of building or zoning regulations or of the betting and gaming legislation or indeed of the regulations governing broadcasting.

The injunction was denied, and the decision was appealed to the High Court.

Ruling at the High Court

In a 3–2 decision, the appeal was dismissed, as no wrong was committed that was known to the law. Separate opinions were issued by all justices  Latham CJ, Dixon and McTiernan JJ for the majority, and Rich and Evatt JJ in dissent.

 There was no property in a spectacle. As Latham CJ noted:

 Nor could copyright be claimed in any information being posted on signs in the park:

 There was no proof that nuisance had been brought upon the race track, as McTiernan J observed:

 The Court did not recognize the existence of a legal right to privacy. As Latham CJ stated:

 Building the platform was not an unnatural use of property, as it did not breach any bylaws.

Impact

The case was notable for rejecting the concept of quasi-property that had been recently adopted by the United States Supreme Court in International News Service v. Associated Press, and has been influential in many common law jurisdictions in the Commonwealth. The reluctance was summarized by Dixon J thus:

As to the question of privacy in Australian law, the High Court subsequently declared in ABC v Lenah Game Meats Pty Ltd that Victoria Park was not a case about privacy. Rather, it was concerned with allocating the right to appropriate and control how information can be made public.

Aftermath

Off-track betting was subsequently brought under State regulation in New South Wales by the Gaming and Betting (Amendment) Act 1938, and the Parliament of Australia later passed the Broadcasting and Television Act 1956, prohibiting television stations (but not radio stations) from televising "the whole or part of a sporting event or other entertainment held in Australia … in a place in which a charge is made for admission, if the images of the sporting event or other entertainment originate from the use of equipment outside that place". Radio stations were not included, as they had previously reached an agreement on the matter with the racecourse owners.

References

High Court of Australia cases
1937 in Australian law
1937 in case law
Australian copyright case law
Privacy in Australia
Privacy case law
Australian property law
Australian tort case law